The Pentax K-r is a 12.4-megapixel digital single-lens reflex camera, announced on September 9, 2010, and replaced the K-x in Pentax' line-up, with which it shares many features. The K-r is available in three body colors (black, white and red) in North America, with other colors available only in the Japanese market. The K-r introduces a new SAFOX IX autofocus system and has a 3-inch display. 
The image quality of Pentax K-r and K-x is identical, but colour fidelity in JPEG output has been increased. The K-r has been improved over the K-x in other areas, such as the K-r showing the active focus point in the viewfinder when the shutter button is half-pressed, the K-r offering the joint second-widest ISO range in the Pentax line-up along with K-30—100-25600 in extended mode, which only the K-5 exceeds (K-x: 12800 in extended mode), having the joint second-fastest continuous shooting (6.0 fps) of current Pentax DSLRs (same as the K-30), and using rechargeable battery Li-Ion D-LI109 as standard, but having the ability to use 4 × AA batteries with optional battery holder (the K-x uses AA batteries exclusively). The K-r also has a slightly larger, and much higher resolving display at 921,000 pixels vs. the K-x's 230,000.

HDR (high dynamic range) capture 
As in the K-x, the user can choose to have the camera take three images at different exposures and have them combined into a high dynamic range JPEG image. In contrast to its predecessor, the Pentax K-r offers the option to auto-align the images.

References

External links

 Pentax K-r official product page
 Full-length camera review

K-r
Live-preview digital cameras
Cameras introduced in 2010
Pentax K-mount cameras